Gracciano dell'Elsa is a village in Tuscany, central Italy, administratively a frazione of the comune of Colle di Val d'Elsa, province of Siena.

Gracciano dell'Elsa is about 26 km from Siena and 2 km from Colle di Val d'Elsa.

References 

Frazioni of Colle di Val d'Elsa